Gabriel Oscar Moyano Agüero (born 28 July 1992) is an Argentine footballer.

He formerly played for Magallanes in the Primera B de Chile.

References

External links
 Player profile at http://www.bdfa.com.ar 
 

1992 births
Living people
Argentine footballers
Argentine expatriate footballers
Godoy Cruz Antonio Tomba footballers
Magallanes footballers
Primera B de Chile players
Argentine Primera División players
Expatriate footballers in Chile
Association football midfielders
Sportspeople from Mendoza, Argentina